Lysosome-associated membrane protein 2 (LAMP2), also known as CD107b (Cluster of Differentiation 107b) and Mac-3, is a human gene. Its protein, LAMP2, is one of the lysosome-associated membrane glycoproteins.

The protein encoded by this gene is a member of a family of membrane glycoproteins.  This glycoprotein provides selectins with carbohydrate ligands.  It may play a role in tumor cell metastasis.  It may also function in the protection, maintenance, and adhesion of the lysosome.  Alternative splicing of the gene produces three variants - LAMP-2A, LAMP-2B and LAMP-2C. LAMP-2A is the receptor for chaperone-mediated autophagy. Recently it has been determined that antibodies against LAMP-2 account for a fraction of patients who get a serious kidney disease termed focal necrotizing glomerulonephritis.

LAMP-2B is associated with Danon disease.

Structure and tissue distribution 

The gene for LAMP2 has 9 coding exons and 2 alternate last exons, 9a and 9b. When the last exon is spliced with the alternative exon, it is a variant called LAMP2b, which varies in the last 11 amino acids of its C-terminal sequence: in the luminal domain, the transmembrane domain, and the cytoplasmic tail. The original (LAMP2a) is highly expressed in the placenta, lung, and liver, while LAMP2b is highly expressed in skeletal muscle.

Function 

Lysosomes are cell organelles found in most animal cells. Their main functions center around breaking down materials and debris in the cell. Some of this is done via acid hydrolases that degrade foreign materials and have specialized autolytic functions. These hydrolyses are stored in the lysosomal membrane, which also house lysosomal membrane glycoproteins.

LAMP1 and LAMP2 make up about 50% of lysosomal membrane glycoproteins. (See LAMP1 for more information on both LAMP1 and LAMP2.) Both of these consist of polypeptides of about 40 kD, with the core polypeptide surrounded by 16 to 20 attached N-linked saccharides. The biological functions of these glycoproteins are disputed. They are believed to be significantly involved in operations of the lysosomes, including maintaining integrity, pH and catabolism. Further, some of the functions of LAMP2 are believed to be protecting the lysosomal membrane from proteolytic enzymes that are within the lysosome itself (as in autodigestion),  acting as a receptor into the lysosome for proteins, adhesion (when expressed on the outside surface of the plasma membrane) and signal transduction, both inter- and intra-.  It also provides protection for the cell from methylating mutagens.

Role in cancer 

LAMP2 has been specifically implicated in tumor cell metastasis. Both LAMP1 and LAMP2 have been found expressed on the surface of cancerous tumors, specifically in cells of highly metastatic cancer such as colon cancer and melanoma. They are rarely found on the plasma membranes of normal cells, and are found more on highly metastatic tumors than on poorly metastatic ones. LAMP2, along with LAMP1, interact with E-selectin and galectins to mediate the adhesion of some cancer cells to the ECM. The two LAMP molecules act as ligands for the cell-adhesion molecules.

It has also been shown that the down-regulation of LAMP2 could both reduce the resistance of breast cancer cells to the paclitaxel and could inhibit cell proliferation in multiple myeloma cells.

Along with other genes such as LC3B, p62 and CTSB, a strong up regulation of LAMP2 was detected in perinecrotic areas of glioblastomas. This suggests autophagy induction in gliomas could be caused by micro-environmental changes.

In a study of glial tumors, the cell membranes of glial and endothelial cells were found to contain LAMP1 and LAMP2, while YKL-40 (a different glycoprotein) was found in the cytoplasm. This suggests that the three glycoproteins are involved in tumor development, specifically in the processes of angiogenesis and tissue remodeling.

Inducers
 CA77.1
 QX39

See also 
 Cluster of differentiation

References

Further reading

External links 
 
 PDBe-KB provides an overview of all the structure information available in the PDB for Human Lysosome-associated membrane glycoprotein 2

Clusters of differentiation